Crinodes is a genus of moths of the family Notodontidae erected by Gottlieb August Wilhelm Herrich-Schäffer in 1855.

Selected species
Crinodes biedermani (Skinner, 1905) (sometimes placed in Astylis)

References

Notodontidae